Wakayama at-large district is a constituency in the House of Councillors of Japan, the upper house of the Diet of Japan (national legislature). It currently elects 2 members to the House of Councillors, 1 per election. The current representatives are:

 Hiroshige Sekō, first elected in 1998. Term ends in 2025. Member of the Liberal Democratic Party.
 Yōsuke Tsuruho, first elected in 1998. Term ends in 2022. Member of the Liberal Democratic Party.

The district has an electorate of 809,547 as of May 2021.

References 

Districts of the House of Councillors (Japan)